The Avro Type 557 Ava was a British twin-engined biplane torpedo bomber of the 1920s. It was developed by Avro to meet a requirement for a heavy torpedo bomber for the Royal Air Force but was unsuccessful, only two prototypes being built.

Design and development
The British Air Ministry produced Specification 16/22 in 1922 for a long-range land-based torpedo bomber. The specification required that the aircraft be capable of carrying a 21 in (533 mm) torpedo or an equivalent weight of bombs and produced responses both from Blackburn Aircraft (the Cubaroo) and Avro. Roy Chadwick, chief designer of Avro, initially produced a single-engined design, the Avro 556 powered by a Napier Cub engine, similar to the Cubaroo. This was rejected in favour of a twin-engined aircraft using two Rolls-Royce Condor engines, the Avro Type 557 Ava and winning an order for two prototypes from the Air Ministry. Completed in secret (owing to its armament of a 21 in (533 mm) torpedo, thought to be able to sink the largest warships), the first prototype Ava (serial number N171) flew in mid-1924.

The Ava was a three-bay biplane of wooden construction, with the un-cowled engines between the wings. It had a biplane tail, initially fitted with triple rudders, of which the centre rudder was soon removed. The fuselage accommodated two pilots in an open cockpit, with nose and dorsal gun positions and a retractable ventral "dustbin" gun position that could be manned by the navigator/bomb aimer, who otherwise occupied a large enclosed cabin. The 2,000 lb (910 kg) torpedo or equivalent bomb load were carried on external racks under the fuselage.

The Air Ministry dropped its plans to use the 21 in (533 mm) torpedo but Avro continued with construction of the second prototype, which was of all-metal construction but was otherwise similar to the first prototype, flying on 22 April 1927. While a modified version of the Ava was proposed to meet Specification B19/27 for a heavy bomber, it was unsuccessful, no further aircraft being built.

Variants
Ava Mk I
 First prototype. Wooden construction.
Ava Mk II
 Second prototype. Metal construction.

Specifications (Ava Mk I)

See also

References

External links

 Avro Ava – British Aircraft Directory

557 Ava
1920s British bomber aircraft
Cancelled military aircraft projects of the United Kingdom
Biplanes
Twin piston-engined tractor aircraft
Aircraft first flown in 1924